Vincent Ialenti is an American anthropologist who studies the culture of nuclear energy and weapons waste organizations. He is the author of Deep Time Reckoning, an anthropological exploration of how experts assessed the potential impact of Finland's Onkalo spent nuclear fuel repository on future ecosystems and civilization.

Ialenti has been on the research faculty at George Washington University's Elliott School of International Affairs and has held fellowships at the University of Southern California, the University of British Columbia, The Berggruen Institute, and Cornell University's Society for the Humanities.

Ialenti currently works for the U.S. Department of Energy's Office of Nuclear Energy, advising senior leadership on efforts to implement more environmentally just and consent-based approaches to siting nuclear waste facilities.

Biography 
Ialenti holds a BA, in "Philosophy, Politics, and Law" from Binghamton University, an MSc in "Law, Anthropology, and Society" from the London School of Economics, and a PhD in Sociocultural Anthropology from Cornell University. At Cornell, Ialenti taught an interdisciplinary writing seminar called Nuclear Imagination: Technology and Worlds.

In 2017, Ialenti became the first anthropologist with a feature article in Physics Today, the flagship publication of the American Institute of Physics. Later that year, Helsingin Sanomat published a front-page human interest story about his anthropological search for insights left behind by an enigmatic nuclear waste expert he called Seppo.

In 2018, Ialenti was a Nuclear Security Innovation Network Fellow in the N Square Collaborative, a nuclear threat awareness collective funded by the Carnegie Corporation, the Hewlett Foundation, and the Ploughshares Fund. He also served on the U.S. Membership Committee of Northwestern University's trans-Pacific think-tank Meridian 180.

From 2017 to 2019, Ialenti conducted a field study exploring the political, economic, and organizational drivers behind transuranic nuclear weapons waste "drum breach" accidents at Idaho National Laboratory and the Waste Isolation Pilot Plant. He developed this study in collaboration with geologist Allison Macfarlane, the former Chair of the U.S. Nuclear Regulatory Commission.

MIT Press published Ialenti's first book, Deep Time Reckoning, in 2020. It was distributed by Penguin Random House. The book examined Finnish nuclear waste company Posiva's efforts to make reductive, pragmatic models of far future societies, bodies, and ecosystems—and how their efforts were enabled by the Finnish populace's relatively high levels of trust in geotechnical engineers, regulators, and ministry experts.

In 2021, Ialenti became the first cultural anthropologist with an article published in the American Nuclear Society's technical journal Nuclear Technology. The article examines Finland's cooperative "mankala" nuclear energy LLCs through the lens of legal-anthropological theories of corporate form. Later that year, Ialenti was featured alongside ambient musician Brian Eno in a Headspace meditation podcast about long-term thinking.

Ialenti is an Associate of the Long Now Foundation in San Francisco, California.

Personal life
Ialenti is married to conservationist Allegra Wrocklage. They reside in Los Angeles, California, after having moved from Vancouver, Canada.

Books

References

External links
 

Alumni of the London School of Economics
American anthropologists
Binghamton University alumni
Cornell University alumni
Elliott School of International Affairs faculty
People from Gardner, Massachusetts
Year of birth missing (living people)
Living people